Cartonnage (word of French origin) is a type of material used in ancient Egyptian funerary masks from the First Intermediate Period to the Roman era. It was made of layers of linen or papyrus covered with plaster. Some of the Fayum mummy portraits are also painted on panels made of cartonnage.

Technique

In a technique similar to papier-mâché, scraps of linen or papyrus were stuck together with plaster or resin and used to make mummy cases and masks. It could be molded to the shape of the body, forming a type of shell. After the material dried it could be painted or gilded. The shell could be decorated with geometric shapes, deities, and inscriptions. During the Ptolemaic era, the single shell method was altered to include four to six pieces of cartonnage. There would generally be a mask, pectoral, apron, and foot casing. In certain instances there were two additional pieces used to cover the ribcage and stomach.

Materials

The materials used to produce cartonnage changed over time. In the Middle Kingdom it was common to use plastered linen, during the Third Intermediate Period, linen and stucco, during the Ptolemaic period, old papyrus scrolls and during the Roman period, thicker fibrous materials.

Reusing papyrus that was considered waste was a common practice during the Ptolemaic period. Many discarded documents from the government and archives were used for this purpose.

Archeological significance
The preparation of cartonnage preserved the sections of papyrus; therefore, it is a prominent source of well-preserved manuscript sections. In 1993, the city of Helsinki received fourteen fragments of cartonnages from the Egyptian Museum of Berlin. Conservators were tasked with preserving the cartonnages and publishing all Greek papyrus texts derived from them.

References

External links
 The Walters Art Museum – Mummies and Cartonnage
 Video – Mummy Cartonnage Conservation
 Google Art Project
 Shaw, Ian; and Nicholson, Paul. The Dictionary of Ancient Egypt. p. 61. The British Museum Press, 1995.
 Digital Egypt, fuller history

Ancient Egyptian funerary practices
Egyptology